Bipolar UK, formerly the MDF The Bipolar Organization, was established in 1983 (as the Manic Depression Fellowship) to enable people affected by bipolar disorder to take control of their lives. It is the only national charity that specializes in supporting bipolar disorder and is one of the largest user-led organizations in the mental health sector in the UK.

The charity is based in London, Charity Number 293340, with a staff of 14 people and 200 volunteers across the country.

MDF The Bipolar Organization was formed by Sheila Woodland and Philomena Germing in 1983, along with 41 other individuals. The society's first meeting was in January 1983 in Westminster Cathedral. In 2011 the organization changed its name from MDF to Bipolar UK. The group was formed to support those affected by bipolar, including those with a formal diagnosis, their families, and friends. As of 2022 the organization runs 85 support groups across England, Wales, and Northern Ireland.

The Charity’s day-to-day activities are led by CEO Simon Kitchen  and Deputy CEO Rosie Phillips. Overseeing the running of the charitable entity is 13 member Board of Trustees:

 Guy Paisner, Chair
 Hilary Samson-Barry, Vice Chair
 Sarita Dent, Treasurer
 Alice Alphandary
 Melissa Barnett
 Jeremy Clark
 Derrick Dale
 Mohini Morris
 Robert Print
 Nadia Silver
 Jennifer Trent Staves
 Bill Walden-Jones
 Allan Young

See also 
 Mental health in the United Kingdom

References

Mental health organisations in the United Kingdom
Bipolar disorder